Christian Hernando Rivera Cuéllar (born 14 January 1996) is a Colombian professional footballer who plays as a midfielder for Liga MX club Querétaro, on loan from Tijuana.

Club career
Born in Cali, Rivera is the son of Hernando and Yenny. He began playing football at age four at the Universidad Santiago de Cali, where his mother worked as a teacher. When Rivera turned nine, he joined the Sarmiento Lora academy where he had to balance his football training and studies. In 2012, Rivera was selected from three players at Sarmiento Lora, including future first team teammate Alveiro Sánchez, to join local club Deportivo Cali. He made his professional debut for Cali on 17 February 2016 against Fortaleza. He came on as a late stoppage time substitute as Cali won 1–0. Midway through the 2016 season, at the start of the Torneo Finalización, Rivera joined Deportivo Pasto, making his debut on 10 July against Boyacá Chicó as a halftime substitute in the 2–0 victory.

The next season, on 3 February 2017, Rivera scored his first professional goal for Pasto against Cortuluá. His 89th-minute goal was the fourth in a 4–0 victory. Prior to the second half of the season, Rivera returned to Deportivo Cali, making his debut on 5 July 2017 against Cúcuta Deportivo. On 26 July, Rivera scored a brace for Cali against Cúcuta Deportivo in the second leg of the Copa Colombia in a 3–1 victory.

During the 2019 season, Rivera finished as the top goalscorer in the Copa Colombia where he led Deportivo Cali to final against Independiente Medellín.

Tijuana
On 3 January 2020, Rivera joined Liga MX club Tijuana on loan with a purchase option. He made his debut for the club on 10 January 2020 against Santos Laguna, coming on as a 58th minute substitute in a 2–1 victory. Prior to the Torneo Guardianes 2021, Rivera joined Tijuana on a permanent basis.

Career statistics

References

External links
 Profile at Tijuana

1996 births
Living people
Footballers from Cali
Colombian footballers
Association football midfielders
Deportivo Cali footballers
Deportivo Pasto footballers
Club Tijuana footballers
Categoría Primera A players
Liga MX players
Colombian expatriate footballers
Expatriate footballers in Mexico